39 Engineer Regiment (39 Engr Regt) is a battalion-sized regiment of the British Army formed in 1951 and based in Kinloss in Scotland.

History 
It was in Kenya in the early 1950s, up until 1955, and elements took part in anti-Mau Mau operations. 

An announcement in November 2011 confirmed that 39 Engineer Regiment (Air Support) RE would move from Waterbeach Barracks, near Cambridge, to Kinloss, in July 2012. It was expected that 930 service personnel and their families would move at this time.

As of 2016, the regiment consisted of five squadrons:

 39 Engineer Regiment, Kinloss Barracks
 60 Headquarters and Support Squadron
 34 Field Squadron
 48 Field Squadron
 53 Field Squadron
 65 Field Support Squadron
 REME Workshop

References

External links
 

39
Military units and formations established in 1951
1951 establishments in the United Kingdom
1951 establishments in Scotland